Word Jazz is the debut album by voice-over and recording artist Ken Nordine with the Fred Katz Group which was released on the Dot label in 1957.

Reception

The Allmusic site rated the album  stars stating "the combination sounds not unlike a radio announcer performing beat poetry in places...mostly because that's exactly what it is. That would be selling this album short, though, because Nordine proves himself more than capable of providing both the smooth vocal tones as well as the truly twisted creative sense necessary to pull this off... Word Jazz is still an innovative album and definitely worthy of the sequels that followed."

Track listing
All compositions by Ken Nordine and Fred Katz
 "What Time Is It?" – 3:48
 "My Baby" – 2:36
 "Sound Museum" – 7:09
 "The Vidiot" – 5:30
 "Roger" – 5:05
 "Hunger Is From" – 3:47
 "Looks Like It's Going to Rain" – 3:27
 "Flibberty Jib" – 4:42

Personnel
Ken Nordine – narration
Fred Katz – cello 
Paul Horn – saxophone, flute, piccolo, clarinet
John Pisano as "John Asano" – guitar 
Richard Marx – piano
Jimmy Bond – bass 
Chico Hamilton as "Forest Horn" – drums, bongos, timpani, gong
Jim Cunningham – sound patterns

References

Dot Records albums
Ken Nordine albums
1957 albums